Caralee McElroy (born December 27, 1983) is a Brooklyn-based American multi-instrumentalist who has played in the bands Xiu Xiu, XXL, and Cold Cave.

Biography
McElroy was born in Olympia, WA and was raised in Modesto, California and Seattle, Washington. She grew up immersed in both music and the visual arts. Her father, Brent, is a luthier and builds acoustic guitars.

Music

At seven, McElroy started to study the flute, and throughout her school years, she picked up the guitar, percussion, drums, and keyboards.

Xiu Xiu

In 2003, McElroy met her long-lost cousin, Jamie Stewart of Xiu Xiu. He needed a multi-instrumentalist, so she auditioned and joined Xiu Xiu during their Fabulous Muscles tour in 2004. McElroy left Xiu Xiu in May 2009.

Cold Cave

In February 2009, Caralee joined the band Cold Cave. She left in early 2010.

Other activities and collaborations
McElroy appeared on recordings for Casiotone for the Painfully Alone in 2006. As of 2009, she has been collaborating on a yet-to-be-named musical project with Chris Garneau.

Discography
with Xiu Xiu
2004 – "Fleshettes" CD single
2005 – La Forêt
2006 – The Air Force
2007 – Remixed & Covered
2008 - Women as Lovers

with XXL (Xiu Xiu Larsen)
2005 – Ciautistico!
2007 – ¿Spicchiology?

with Cold Cave
2009 - Electronic Dreams cassette
2009 - Cremations CD
2009 - Stars Explode split cassette with Prurient
2009 - Easel and Ruby 12" single
2009 - Love Comes Close CD/LP

with Casiotone for the Painfully Alone
2006 - Graceland
2006 - Young Shields

References

External links

Caralee McElroy Discography at CD Universe

American multi-instrumentalists
Musicians from Seattle
Musicians from Modesto, California
Musicians from Olympia, Washington
1983 births
Living people
American women in electronic music
Guitarists from California
Guitarists from Washington (state)
21st-century American women guitarists
21st-century American guitarists